Green River is an unincorporated community in Edford Township, Henry County, Illinois, United States.

Geography

References
 

Unincorporated communities in Illinois
Unincorporated communities in Henry County, Illinois